Victoria Aleksanyan (born 1987 in Yerevan, Armenia) is an Armenian film director and a co-founder of IFCA Independent Filmmakers Community of Armenia. Aleksanyan has written, directed and produced a number of short films.

Education 
Aleksanyan holds a master's degree in Fine Arts in Film from Columbia University, and in economic journalism from Russian-Armenian University. She received post-production fellowship from Baden-Wurttemberg Filmakademie.

Career 
Aleksanyan started her career as a journalist, working in a number of cultural magazines in Armenia. After graduating from Russian-Armenian University and receiving a master's degree in journalism, Aleksanyan's professional path took an artistic direction. She joined an outdoor theater project in Norway as a blogger and a performer and shortly after moved to New York City to study Film at Columbia University.

In November 2018 Aleksanyan implemented a Filmmaking Learning Lab for Tumo Center for Creative Technologies in Gyumri and held a one-month intensive educational film workshop which resulted in a production of a collaborative short film, created by the Tumo students, called “Gyumri, my love.”

She also served on the Independent Film Committee for National Cinema Center, reviewing and judging the film projects and scripts for the 2018 State Funding Competition.

Now, Aleksanyan is the co-founder, fundraiser, and Board Member of IFCA, Independent Filmmakers Community of Armenia.

Filmography

Director 

 Man of God 2016
 Caregivers 2014

Producer 

 Don't Think About It 2016 
 The Professor: Tai Chi's Journey West 2016
 Risky Drinking 2016
 The Real American 2015
 The Baptizm Of Joshua Cohen 2014
 Broken Badge 2014

Second Unit Director 

 Baggage 2016
 Mrs. Nebile's Wormhole 2016

Art department 

 Bittersweet Sixteen 2014

Awards and nominations 
Best Film Nomination at Golden Apricot IFF Armenian Panorama 2014

Best Foreign Film Award at Sunset Film festival, Los-Angeles in 2015.

References 

1987 births
Living people
Armenian women film directors
Armenian film producers
Columbia University School of the Arts alumni
Russian-Armenian University alumni
Armenian journalists by type